Josiah Steinbrick (born July 13, 1981) is an American multi-instrumentalist, composer, and record producer, currently based in Los Angeles, California, United States. Aside from his own solo works and performances with his BANANA ensemble, he has produced albums by Cate Le Bon and Devendra Banhart and has recorded with artists such as Danger Mouse, Charlotte Gainsbourg, Gruff Rhys, Rodrigo Amarante, and Sam Gendel. He provided the score to the 2020 film, Horse Girl, starring Alison Brie.

Selected discography

2009
Joker's Daughter – The Last Laugh – Guitar, Bass, Synthesizer

2010
Adam Green – Minor Love – Bass, Synthesizer, Omnichord
White Fence – "Live in L.A." (Cassette) – Bass

2011
Boom Bip – Zig Zaj – Bass, Synthesizer, Percussion

2012
Charlotte Gainsbourg – Stage Whisper – Sitar Guitar
Electric Guest – Mondo – Bass, Guitar (Electric), Harpsichord, Synthesizer

2013
Adam Green & Binki Shapiro – Bass, Guitar, Piano, Kalimba, Omnichord, Synthesizer
Devendra Banhart – Mala – Bass, Clapping, Dulcimer, Percussion, Soloist, Synthesizer, Synthesizer Saxophone
Neon Neon – Praxis Makes Perfect – Composer, Synthesizer
Cate Le Bon – Mug Museum – Producer, Guitar, Organ, Synthesizer, Drums
Rodrigo Amarante – "Cavalo" – Backing Vocals

2015
H. Hawkline – In the Pink of Condition – Bass, Guitar, Piano, Harpsichord, Synthesizer 
Flo Morrissey – Tomorrow Will Be Beautiful – Bass, Harpsichord

2016
Cate Le Bon – Crab Day – Producer, Piano, Bass, Percussion 
Adam Green – Aladdin Soundtrack – Bass, Synthesizers, Piano 
Devendra Banhart – Ape in Pink Marble – Producer, Composer, Bass, Synthesizers, Electric Piano, Guitar, Drums, Percussion, Koto, Marimba, Backing Vocals

2017
BANANA (also featuring Cate Le Bon, Sweet Baboo, H. Hawkline, Stella Mozgawa and Josh Klinghoffer) – Live – Composer, Producer, Vibraphone, Piano

2018
Josiah Steinbrick – Meeting of Waters – Composer, Marimba, Vibraphone, Drums, Percussion, Synthesizer

2019
Cate Le Bon – Reward – Producer, Percussion, Synthesizers
Devendra Banhart – Ma – Synthesizers, Vibraphone

References

1981 births
Living people
Musicians from Providence, Rhode Island
American multi-instrumentalists
Punk rock bass guitarists
Hardcore punk musicians
American record producers
American male bass guitarists
American male guitarists
American keyboardists
American percussionists
American male drummers
Guitarists from Rhode Island
American composers